"Heaven" is a song by the Canadian singer and songwriter Bryan Adams recorded in 1983, written by Adams and Jim Vallance. It first appeared on the A Night in Heaven soundtrack album the same year and was later included on Adams' album Reckless in 1984. It was released as the third single from Reckless and reached number one on the U.S. Billboard Hot 100 in June 1985, over a year and a half after the song first appeared on record. The single was certified Gold in Canada in 1985.

Heavily influenced by Journey's 1983 hit "Faithfully", the song was written while Adams served as the opening act on the band's Frontiers Tour, and features their drummer, Steve Smith. It provided Adams with his first number one single and third top 10 hit on the Billboard Hot 100 chart. The track placed number 24 on Billboard magazine's Top Pop Singles of 1985.

Writing and recording
Adams had played over 100 dates with Journey during 1983, serving as the opening act on their Frontiers Tour. During that time, he and Jim Vallance co-wrote "Heaven", which was inspired by Journey's hit "Faithfully". It was recorded at the Power Station in New York City on June 6 and 7, 1983. Halfway through the recording session, drummer Mickey Curry – who had warned Adams about his limited availability that day – announced that he had to leave since he had committed in advance to a Hall & Oates session. Since the recording session for "Heaven" was running behind schedule, Adams called Journey drummer Steve Smith, who happened to be in New York City at the time and he filled Curry's drumming position. The song first appeared on the soundtrack to the 1983 film, A Night in Heaven, although it was not released as a single at that time.

Adams was unconvinced that "Heaven" was suitable for his next studio album, Reckless, a feeling that was echoed by producer Jimmy Iovine, who was working with Adams at the time. Iovine thought the song was too 'light' for the album and recommended that Adams not include it. But at the last moment, Adams changed his mind.

Reception and awards
For All Music Guide, Stewart Mason called the song "the power ballad that transcends the inherent cheesiness of the style to become a genuinely effective single." Mason also praised the "solid melody" and "appropriately bombastic arrangement...over which Adams delivers his most effective vocal performance ever."

In 1984, "Heaven" won the Procan Award (Performing Rights Organization of Canada) for Canadian radio airplay, in 1985, it won the BMI (Broadcast Music Inc.) Citation of Achievement for U.S. radio airplay and ten years later, it won a Socan Classics Award for more than 100,000 Canadian radio performances.

Chart performance
"Heaven" first appeared on the A Night in Heaven soundtrack album in 1983 and received substantial airplay on album-oriented rock radio stations, reaching the number nine on Billboards Top Tracks chart in February 1984. It was released as the third single from the album Reckless in April 1985 and hit number one on the Billboard Hot 100 chart, the highest-charting single from "Reckless". The song also re-entered the Top Rock Tracks chart at that time, peaking at number 27. "Heaven" also peaked at number 12 on the Adult Contemporary chart during its second run, becoming Adams' second single to reach that chart after "Straight from the Heart" in 1983, and his biggest AC hit until 1991.

In Canada, "Heaven" reached number 11 on the RPM Singles Chart.

The song was also released in Australia, Europe, and New Zealand in 1985. "Heaven" peaked at number 38 in the UK. In several mainland European countries, "Heaven" was the first hit for Adams. "Heaven" reached the top 10 in Sweden and Norway and then the top 20 in Austria, Ireland, Switzerland, and Sweden, it was a moderate top hundred success in Germany where it peaked at number 62. In Australia, it peaked at number 12.

Music video
There were two videos, one shot at the Stanley Industrial Alliance Stage in Vancouver, British Columbia, Canada, and directed by Steve Barron. That video includes appearances by Lysette Anthony, Garwin Sanford and Anthony Harrison. The second video was shot in London, England, and features Adams singing the song in a live concert setting; behind him, stacked video monitors show his band playing along. Video monitors also occupy each seat of the otherwise empty theater. At the end it is all revealed to be a dream of Adams. The video was nominated for an MTV Video Music Award for Best Cinematography.

Track listings
US 7-inch (A&M 2729)
"Heaven"
"Heaven" (live)

US 12-inch promo (A&M SP-17318)
"Heaven"
"Heaven" (live)/"Kids Wanna Rock" (live)

UK 7-inch (A&M AM256)
"Heaven"
"Diana"

UK 12-inch (A&M AMY256)
"Heaven"/"Diana"
"Heaven" (live)/"Fits Ya Good"

Live tracks recorded at the Hollywood Palladium on February 1, 1985.

Personnel
 Bryan Adams – vocals, piano and tambourine
 Keith Scott – electric guitar
 Rob Sabino –synthesizers
 Dave Taylor – bass
 Steve Smith – drums

Charts

Weekly charts

Year-end charts

Decade-end charts

Certifications

DJ Sammy and Yanou version

Spanish DJ Sammy and German DJ Yanou recorded a dance cover of "Heaven" with vocals from Dutch singer Do. It was initially released on November 21, 2001, as the first single from DJ Sammy's second studio album Heaven (2002).

Chart performance
The song reached number one on the UK Singles Chart and number eight on the US Billboard Hot 100. It re-entered the chart on the week of November 17, 2007. On October 28, 2009, over seven years after its release, the song was certified gold by the Recording Industry Association of America (RIAA) for sales of over 500,000. It has also been certified double platinum by the British Phonographic Industry (BPI) for sales and streams of over 1,200,000 units.

Music video
The music video was directed by Oliver Bradford. It features Yanou, DJ Sammy and Do viewed briefly from a television. The video features two Asian girls, androgynous people and a black man. It featured a family of four. There is a second version, with extended scenes of a stationary Do singing and no scenes of Yanou.

Live performances
Do performed the song with Westlife live in 2002 in the UK, and also with Westlife at the TMF Awards in 2003. Do also performed the song several times together with Bryan Adams, in the Netherlands and Germany.

Charts

Weekly charts

Year-end charts

Decade-end charts

Certifications

Release history

Do version

Candlelight Mix
Because of the Eurodance version's popularity, a stripped-down "Candlelight Mix" ballad version was made and sung by Do, and received airplay on adult contemporary radio stations as well as contemporary hit radio stations.

9/11 remix
An unauthorized remix of the "Candlelight Mix" was made by KKXX in Bakersfield, California to commemorate the first anniversary of the September 11 attacks, featuring a kindergarten-aged girl telling the story of her father's death in the attacks, interspersed with the original chorus. While the monologue is based on a true story, the girl was actually the daughter of a former KISS FM program director, who was reading off a script and did not know about the attacks at the time.

See also
Her Smell, a film that includes a rendition of "Heaven" performed by Elisabeth Moss

References

1983 songs
1985 singles
2001 singles
2002 singles
2003 singles
Bryan Adams songs
Rock ballads
DJ Sammy songs
Do (singer) songs
Eurodance songs
Billboard Hot 100 number-one singles
Cashbox number-one singles
Number-one singles in Scotland
UK Singles Chart number-one singles
Music videos directed by Steve Barron
Songs written by Jim Vallance
Songs written by Bryan Adams
A&M Records singles
Ministry of Sound singles
Data Records singles
Song recordings produced by Bob Clearmountain
Songs about death
1980s ballads
2000s ballads